Anshuman Jha is an Indian actor who works in Hindi films and theatre. He is known for his role in Love Sex Aur Dhokha. He had been rated as one of the "Top Ten Bollywood Actors of 2010" by Rediff. He appeared in films such as Yeh Hai Bakrapur (2014), X: Past Is Present (2015), Chauranga (2016), Mona Darling (2017), Angrezi Mein Kehte Hain (2018) and No Fathers In Kashmir (2019). His 2020 Web show Mastram has had over a billion views on MX Player. He played the lead in the film Hum Bhi Akele Tum Bhi Akele (2021). His latest release, the Action-Thriller titled Lakadbaggha (2023), has won him lots of critical acclaim including the Best Actor Award as the South Asian International Film festival presented by HBO 

He started his career as a producer with his film Mona Darling under his banner First Ray Films. He did his schooling from Manava Bharati India International School, New Delhi and graduated in economics from St. Xavier's College, Mumbai. He also has a diploma in acting from Barry John's Imago School of Acting. He was also voted as the "Advertising Face of the Year 2011" by CNBC-TV18's Storyboard. He was also seen as the Lead Character of "Bhola" in the Biggest Bollywood Musical of India – Jhumroo – at Kingdom of Dreams in Gurgaon from February 2016 to March 2017.

Career
He began his theatre journey as a 13-year-old by coming to Mumbai from Delhi for Summertime Acting Workshops At Prithvi Theatre. Soon, he made his debut as a professional stage actor in a host of children's plays such as "Jhagrapoor" and "Lalchi" at Prithvi Theatre as a 15-year-old. Jha finished the Diploma Acting Course from Barry John's Academy as a 17-year-old, the youngest ever to have passed out of the course then. He was then cast by Barry John in his play "Its All About Money Honey" in 2002. Jha shifted his base to Mumbai as an 18-year-old and graduated from St. Xavier's College. During these three years, he worked in a host of experimental and non-experimental plays with directors like Quasar Padamsee, Joy Fernandes and Jaimini Pathak. He was assisting Subhash Ghai for a period of three years, during which he acted and directed plays such as Mr. Kolpert. His devised play Dirty Talk was directed by Nayantara Roy. It was India's representation at Contact-World Theatre Festival in 2010 at Manchester, UK. His most recent play is Ramu Ramanathan's classic "The Boy Who Stopped Smiling" where he plays the lead character.
 
Anshuman Jha made his feature film debut as a lead actor in Ekta Kapoor and Dibakar Banerjee's Love Sex Aur Dhokha. He has done select high-profile endorsements for Red Label and Pepsi. He also endorsed Tata Sky from 2011–12. He was seen in a series of adverts for the same "Poochne mein kya jaata hain" campaign. His second release was Kismat Love Paisa Dilli (KLPD) in 2012 and though the film tanked, he was hailed as the most entertaining thing in the film as Nunna by Filmfare. He had one release in 2013 in Boyss Toh Boyss Hain, in which he played the protagonist of a Sardar alongside Rajkumar Rao and Manu Rishi. He later appeared in the film Yeh Hai Bakrapur, released on 9 May.

Jha's recent movie Hum Bhi Akele Tum Bhi Akele was released on 9 May 2021. He plays the lead role opposite Zareen Khan. The film is about a unique love story of two homosexuals. He has also featured in the recent released MX player web series Mastram which was released in April 2020.

Personal life
In July 2020, Anshuman got engaged to his American girlfriend Sierra.  They got married in October 2022 in Yadkinville, North Carolina.

Filmography

Actor

Direction

References

External links
 

Male actors from Uttar Pradesh
Living people
St. Xavier's College, Mumbai alumni
21st-century Indian male actors
Male actors in Hindi cinema
Year of birth missing (living people)